thumb|right|250px| Sacred Heart Cathedral 
The Cathedral of the Sacred Heart of Jesus in Skopje (Macedonian: Катедрала "Пресвето срце Исусово" во Скопје, Katedrala "Presveto srtse Isusovo" vo Skopje) is the Roman Catholic cathedral of the Diocese of Skopje, located in Skopje, the capital of North Macedonia. It was designed by the Macedonian architect Blagoja Mickovski-Bajo and completed in 1977. It replaced the old cathedral of the same name, destroyed by the 1963 Skopje earthquake. In its place is now a museum to Blessed Mother Teresa of Calcutta, who was born in this city.

External links
 http://www.macedonia.co.uk/client/index1.aspx?page=388

Roman Catholic cathedrals in North Macedonia
Buildings and structures in Skopje